
Year 863 (DCCCLXIII) was a common year starting on Friday (link will display the full calendar) of the Julian calendar.

Events 
 By place 
 Byzantine Empire 
 September 3 – Battle of Lalakaon: A Byzantine army confronts an invasion by Muslim forces, led by Umar al-Aqta, Emir of Malatya. The Muslims raid deep into Byzantine territory, reaching the Black Sea coast at the port city of Amisos. Petronas annihilates the Arabs near the River Lalakaon, in Paphlagonia (modern Turkey).

 Europe 
 January 25 – Emperor Louis II claims Provence, after the death of his brother Charles. King Lothair II receives Lower Burgundy and a part of the Jura Mountains.
 King Louis the German suppresses the revolt of his son Carloman (for the second time), who wants a partition (mainly of Bavaria) of the East Frankish Kingdom.
 Viking raiders again plunder Dorestad (modern Netherlands), a Frankish port on the mouth of the river Rhine. It thereafter disappears from the chronicles.
 Danish Vikings loot along the Rhine. They settle on an island near Cologne, but are driven off by the combined forces of Lothair II and the Saxons.
 The Christianization of Kievan Rus begins, ceasing the 63-year-long dominance of the Rus' Khaganate (approximate date).
 The first written record is made of Smolensk (according to the Primary Chronicle).
The Byzantine empire invades Bulgaria in order to impose Orthodox Christianity on Boris I.

 Britain 
 King Osberht of Northumbria engages in a dispute for royal power, with a rival claimant named Ælla. After Osberht is replaced, Ælla wields power in Northumbria, but the civil war continues.

 Asia 
 Duan Chengshi, Chinese author and scholar, writes about the Chinese maritime trade and the Arab-run slave trade in East Africa.

 Armenia 
13 February -863 Dvin earthquake. It took place in the city of Dvin on 13 February, 863. During the 9th century, Dvin was the only "heavily populated" city in Muslim-dominated Armenia. The city was part of the wider Abbasid Caliphate, and had a multiethnic population.

 By topic 

 Religion 
 Pope Nicholas I sends archbishops Gunther and Theotgaud to a synod of Metz, which confirms the permission given to King Lothair II of Lotharingia to remarry.
 The Byzantine missionaries Cyril and Methodius arrive with a few disciples in Moravia, by request of Prince Rastislav.
 Nicholas I excommunicates Patriarch Photios I of Constantinople.

Births 
 Bertha, duchess regent of Lucca and Tuscany (d. 925)
 Li Decheng, general of Wu (Five Dynasties) (d. 940)
 Louis III, king of the West Frankish Kingdom (or 865)
 Shen Song, chancellor of Wuyue (d. 938)
 Wang Yanzhang, general of Later Liang (d. 923)

Deaths 
 January 25 – Charles of Provence, Frankish king (b. 845)
 June 4 – Charles, archbishop of Mainz
 June 6 – Abu Musa Utamish, Muslim vizier 
 October 4 – Turpio, Frankish nobleman
 Ali ibn Yahya al-Armani, Muslim governor
 Bivin of Gorze, Frankish nobleman
 Daniél ua Líahaiti, Irish abbot and poet
 Duan Chengshi, Chinese official and scholar
 Karbeas, leader of the Paulicians
 Mucel, bishop of Hereford (approximate date)
 Muirecán mac Diarmata, king of Leinster
 Umar al-Aqta, emir of Melitene
 Yahya ibn Muhammad, Idrisid emir of Morocco

References